The 2012 Albert Schweitzer Tournament was the 26th edition of the Albert Schweitzer Tournament. 16 teams featured the competition, held in Mannheim and Viernheim from April 7–14.

Group stages

First round
In this round, the 16 teams were allocated in four groups of four teams each. The top three advanced to the Second Round. The last two teams of each group played in the Classification Games.

Group A

|}

Group B

|}

Group C

|}

Group D

|}

Second round

Group E

|}

Group F

|}

Classification Games for 9th – 16th place

Group G

|}

Group H

|}

Knockout round

Championship

15th place game

13th place game

11th place game

9th place game

Semifinals

7th place game

5th place game

Bronze medal game

Final

Final standings

Awards 

All-Tournament Team
 Nikola Radičević
 Josep Pérez
 Paul Zipser
 Mihajlo Andrić
 Willy Hernangómez

External links
Official Website  
Albert Schweitzer Tournament History 

Albert Schweitzer Tournament
2011–12 in German basketball
April 2012 sports events in Europe
21st century in Mannheim
2000s in Baden-Württemberg